Solomon Islands competed in the 2010 Commonwealth Games held in Delhi, India, from 3 to 14 October 2010.

The country was represented by twelve athletes, competed in athletics, boxing, tennis, weightlifting and wrestling.

See also
 2010 Commonwealth Games

References

External links
  Times of India

Nations at the 2010 Commonwealth Games